James Douglas Bird (born March 5, 1950) is a retired Major League Baseball pitcher from  to . Bird was drafted by the Kansas City Royals in the third round of the 1969 amateur draft's secondary phase.

During his career, Bird was used in a variety of pitching roles, frequently shifting from the bullpen to the starting rotation and back. Bird appeared in six postseason games from 1976 through 1978, all with the Royals, and each time against the New York Yankees, posting a 2.35 ERA in 7.2 innings pitched. After good work in the 1976 and 1977 playoffs, Bird is most known for surrendering a two-run homer to Thurman Munson in the eighth inning of Game Three during the 1978 American League Championship Series.

External links

Doug Bird at Baseball Almanac
The 100 Greatest Royals of All-Time: #43 Doug Bird

Major League Baseball pitchers
Baseball players from California
Fort Myers Sun Sox players
Kansas City Royals players
Philadelphia Phillies players
New York Yankees players
Chicago Cubs players
Boston Red Sox players
Águilas Cibaeñas players
American expatriate baseball players in the Dominican Republic
Winnipeg Goldeyes players
Waterloo Royals players
San Jose Bees players
Jacksonville Suns players
Omaha Royals players
Columbus Clippers players
People from Corona, California
Mt. SAC Mounties baseball players
Sportspeople from Riverside County, California
1950 births
Living people
Arizona Instructional League Royals players